Christian Mauersberger (born 20 April 1995) is German footballer who plays as a midfielder for SGV Freiberg.

Career

Chemnitzer FC
Mauersberger came through Chemnitzer FC's youth team, and was promoted to the first team in 2013. He made his 3. Liga debut on the opening day of the 2013–14 season, as a substitute for Sascha Pfeffer in a 3–0 defeat to VfL Osnabrück. He scored his first competitive goal for the club on 26 October 2013 in a 3–1 home victory over RB Leipzig. His goal, scored in the 17th minute, made the score 1–0 to Chemnitzer.

FC Schalke II
In June 2016, Mauersberger moved to Regionalliga club Schalke II. He made his competitive debut for the club on 2 August 2015 in a 2–0 away defeat to Sportfreunde Lotte. He scored his first competitive goal for the club on 9 April 2016 in a 2–0 home victory over FC Wegberg-Beeck. His goal, scored in the 46th minute, made the score 2–0 to Schalke II.

FSV Zwickau
In May 2017, Mauersberger joined 3. Liga side FSV Zwickau. He made his competitive debut for the club on 4 August 2017 in a 1–1 home draw with Rot-Weiß Erfurt, coming on as a sub for Robert Koch in the 76th minute. He scored his first competitive goal for the club on 15 April 2018 in a 2–1 away defeat to Unterhaching. His goal, assisted by Nils Miatke, came in the 19th minute. At the end of the 2017–18 season, Mauersberger announced his retirement, electing to pursue a career in religion.

Club

References

External links

1995 births
Living people
German footballers
Germany youth international footballers
Chemnitzer FC players
FC Schalke 04 II players
FSV Zwickau players
SGV Freiberg players
3. Liga players
Regionalliga players
Association football midfielders